Miguel Ángel Ferrer Deheza (April 23, 1915 – June 21, 1989) was de facto Federal Interventor of Córdoba, Argentina, from July 27, 1966 to September 13, 1966.

References

1915 births
1989 deaths
People from Córdoba, Argentina
Governors of Córdoba Province, Argentina